Isaak Abelin (6 February 1883, Bern – 1965) was a Swiss physiologist known for describing the Abelin reaction. He qualified in medicine at the University of Bern in 1910, and became professor of physiology in 1927. He worked in the fields of nutrition, metabolism and the thyroid gland.

External links 

Swiss physiologists
1883 births
1965 deaths